Mark Leiter Jr. (born March 13, 1991) is an American professional baseball pitcher in the Chicago Cubs organization. He previously played in Major League Baseball (MLB) for the Philadelphia Phillies and Toronto Blue Jays.

Career

Philadelphia Phillies
Leiter attended Toms River High School North in Toms River, New Jersey and played college baseball at the New Jersey Institute of Technology. He was drafted by the Philadelphia Phillies in the 22nd round of the 2013 Major League Baseball draft and signed. He made his professional debut that year with the GCL Phillies and he was promoted to the Clearwater Threshers and Lakewood BlueClaws during the season. In 45 innings pitched between the three teams, he was 4–0 with a 1.20 ERA. In 2014, he played for Lakewood and Clearwater, compiling a combined 9–12 record and 4.35 ERA in 27 total starts, and in 2015, he pitched with Clearwater and the Reading Fighting Phils, going 8–7 with a 3.09 ERA in 27 games (21 starts). Leiter spent 2016 with Reading where he pitched to a 6–3 record and 3.39 ERA in 23 games (17 starts). He began 2017 with the Lehigh Valley IronPigs.

Leiter was called up to the Major Leagues for the first time on April 18, 2017, making his debut on April 28. He finished his rookie season with a 3–6 record and a 4.96 ERA with 84 strikeouts over 27 appearances (11 starts). He began 2018 on the disabled list and was optioned to Lehigh Valley after he was activated.

Toronto Blue Jays
On September 1, 2018, Leiter was claimed off waivers by the Toronto Blue Jays. He was activated on September 3, and designated for assignment on November 26. He later cleared waivers and was assigned to Triple-A Buffalo.

On March 17, 2019, the Blue Jays organization announced Leiter would miss the entire season after undergoing Tommy John surgery. Leiter elected free agency after the season.

Arizona Diamondbacks
On February 13, 2020, Leiter signed a minor league deal with the Arizona Diamondbacks. Leiter was released by the Diamondbacks organization on May 22, 2020.

Somerset Patriots
Leiter signed with the Somerset Patriots of the Atlantic League of Professional Baseball for the 2020 season. Leiter did not play in a game for the Patriots due to the cancellation of the 2020 ALPB season because of the COVID-19 pandemic.

Detroit Tigers
On March 24, 2021, Leiter signed a minor league contract with the Detroit Tigers organization. Leiter split the 2021 season with the Double-A Erie SeaWolves and the Triple-A Toledo Mud Hens. He made 25 appearances, going 10–8 with a 3.77 ERA and 145 strikeouts. He became a free agent following the season.

Chicago Cubs
On December 17, 2021, Leiter signed a minor league contract with the Chicago Cubs. On April 16, 2022, Leiter's contract was selected by the Cubs. In 35 appearances for Chicago, Leiter registered a 2–7 record and 3.99 ERA with 73 strikeouts in 67.2 innings pitched.

On January 13, 2023, Leiter was designated for assignment by Chicago after the signing of Eric Hosmer was made official. On January 19, Leiter cleared waivers and was sent outright to the Triple-A Iowa Cubs. However, four days later, Leiter rejected the outright assignment and elected free agency. On February 2, Leiter re-signed with the Cubs on a minor league contract.

Personal life
His father, Mark Leiter, and uncle, Al Leiter, pitched in the major leagues. His cousin Jack Leiter was drafted by the Texas Rangers in 2021.

Leiter has been a resident of the Lanoka Harbor section of Lacey Township, New Jersey.

See also
List of second-generation Major League Baseball players

References

External links

1991 births
Living people
American expatriate baseball players in Canada
Baseball players from Fort Lauderdale, Florida
Baseball players from New Jersey
Chicago Cubs players
Clearwater Threshers players
Erie SeaWolves players
Florida Complex League Phillies players
Iowa Cubs players
Lakewood BlueClaws players
Lehigh Valley IronPigs players
Major League Baseball pitchers
Philadelphia Phillies players
Reading Fightin Phils players
Sportspeople from Lacey Township, New Jersey
Sportspeople from Toms River, New Jersey
Toledo Mud Hens players
Toms River High School North alumni
Toronto Blue Jays players